Janet Lagasse  is a former professional tennis player from the United States of America who won the 1982 French Open girls' doubles championship with Beth Herr.

Life and career
Janet Lagasse's main achievement was winning the French Open girls' doubles championship.

References

External links

American female tennis players
Living people
Year of birth missing (living people)
Grand Slam (tennis) champions in girls' doubles
French Open junior champions
21st-century American women